General elections were held in Monaco on 5 February 2023. The result was a landslide victory for the governing Monegasque National Union led by Brigitte Boccone-Pagès, which won all 24 seats on the National Council. The new council was sworn in on 16 February.

Background
The previous elections in February 2018 saw Stéphane Valeri's Priorité Monaco list win 21 of the 24 seats with more than 57% of the vote, with the party taking all seats filled by majority vote and five of the eight filled by proportional representation. Second- and third-placed Horizon Monaco and the Union Monégasque won two and one seats respectively.

Valeri announced his retirement from political life in September 2022. He was succeeded by the vice-president of the National Council, Brigitte Boccone-Pagès, who became the first woman to take the presidency of the National Council. A month later, she announced the merger of Priorité Monaco, Horizon Monaco and the Union Monégasque into the Monegasque National Union (UNM).

Deputy Daniel Boéri, who had left Priorité Monaco in July 2022, became the only opposition MP after the formation of the UNM. He subsequently founded New Ideas for Monaco on 26 October 2022. It campaigned on the themes of ecology and starting a public debate on the legalisation of abortion.

Electoral system
Voters can either choose a party list or choose candidates from various lists (panachage) for the 24 seats. The 16 candidates with the most votes are elected (with the older candidate breaking possible ties in votes). The eight other seats are chosen from lists in accordance with the proportional representation system for parties that have at least five per cent of votes.

Contesting parties

Results

By candidate

Analysis
The elections were won by the Monegasque National Union, which received nearly 90% of the votes and won all 24 seats on the council. It was the largest landslide victory since that of the National and Democratic Union in 1988, before the formation of the other centre-right party National Progressive Action in 1993. The outgoing president of the National Council, Brigitte Boccone-Pagès's mandate, is thus largely renewed. The merger of the parties elected in 2018 into the UNM led to a relative lack of interest among voters for the ballot. With 749 fewer voters than five years earlier despite an increase in the number of voters registered on the lists of 349, voter turnout showed a drop of 13 points, dropping from 70.35% to 57.26%.

Notes

References

Monaco
Elections in Monaco
General